is a passenger railway station located in the city of Hikone, Shiga, Japan, operated by the West Japan Railway Company (JR West).

Lines

Station layout
The station consists of one side platform and one island platforms connected by an elevated concourse. The station building has a Midori no Madoguchi staffed ticket office.

Platform

History
The station opened on 1 May 1896 as a station for passengers and cargo on the Japanese Government Railway (JGR) Tōkaidō Line, which became the Japan National Railways (JNR) after World War II.  Freight operations were discontinued on 15 March 1972. The station came under the aegis of the West Japan Railway Company (JR West) on 1 April 1987 due to the privatization of JNR. A new station building was completed in 1988.

Station numbering was introduced in March 2018 with Kawase being assigned station number JR-A15.

Passenger statistics
In fiscal 2019, the station was used by an average of 3405 passengers daily (boarding passengers only).

Surrounding area
Showa Denko Hikone Office
Shiga Prefectural Kawase Junior and Senior High School

See also
List of railway stations in Japan

References

External links

JR West official home page

Railway stations in Japan opened in 1896
Railway stations in Shiga Prefecture
Tōkaidō Main Line
Hikone, Shiga